In mathematics and theoretical physics (especially twistor theory), twistor space is the complex vector space of solutions of the twistor equation . It was described in the 1960s by Roger Penrose and Malcolm MacCallum. According to Andrew Hodges, twistor space is useful for conceptualizing the way photons travel through space, using four complex numbers. He also posits that twistor space may aid in understanding the asymmetry of the weak nuclear force.

Informal motivation 
In the (translated) words of Jacques Hadamard: "the shortest path between two truths in the real domain passes through the complex domain." Therefore when studying four-dimensional space  it might be valuable to identify it with  However, since there is no canonical way of doing so, instead all isomorphisms respecting orientation and metric between the two are considered. It turns out that complex projective 3-space  parametrizes such isomorphisms together with complex coordinates. It turns out that vector bundles with self-dual connections on (instantons) correspond bijectively to holomorphic bundles on complex projective 3-space

Formal definition
For Minkowski space, denoted , the solutions to the twistor equation are of the form

The  are the Pauli matrices, with  the indexes on the matrices.

which is invariant under the group SU(2,2) which is a quadruple cover of the conformal group C(1,3) of compactified Minkowski spacetime.

Points in Minkowski space are related to subspaces of twistor space through the incidence relation

The geometric relation between projective twistor space and complexified compactified Minkowski space is the same as the relation between lines and two-planes in twistor space; more precisely, twistor space is 

 

It has associated to it the double fibration of flag manifolds  where  is the projective twistor space

In the above,  stands for projective space,  a Grassmannian, and  a flag manifold. The double fibration gives rise to two correspondences (see also Penrose transform),  and  

References

Complex manifolds